The 1951 Jacksonville State Gamecocks football team represented Jacksonville State Teachers College (now known as Jacksonville State University) as a member of the Alabama Intercollegiate Conference (AIC) during the 1951 college football season. Led by sixth-year head coach Don Salls, the Gamecocks compiled an overall record of 3–3–2 with a mark of 2–0 in conference play.

Schedule

References

Jacksonville State
Jacksonville State Gamecocks football seasons
Jacksonville State Gamecocks football